Eric Bekoe (born December 10, 1986) is a Ghanaian football striker. He played for AFC LEOPARDS in the Kenyan football league

Career
In the season 2007/08, with a total 17 goals in 23 matches he became the "Goal King" (top scorer) of the One Touch Premier League and League Champion with Kotoko. He also won the Presidents Cup with them in the same year.

On December 6, 2008, Bekoe signed a four and half years contract with Egypt Premier League club Petrojet. He was set to join Egypt giants Zamalek, but instead Petrojet made a very quick move and the player welcomed it. He became the third non-Egyptian player for the club.

His goal tally so far stands at 22 goals in 28 games in all competitions.

On 18 September 2012, Bekoe joined Berekum Chelsea on a two-year contract.

International career
He made his debut for Ghana by coming off the bench in a friendly match against Mexico on March 26, 2008, and played in the first World Cup Qualification games of his country against Gabon and Libya. Bekoe has represented Ghana at youth level, a.o. at the 2007 Toulon Tournament.

Career stats

References

External links

1986 births
Living people
Association football forwards
Ghanaian footballers
Ghana international footballers
Liberty Professionals F.C. players
Asante Kotoko S.C. players
Footballers from Accra
Heart of Lions F.C. players
Berekum Chelsea F.C. players
Ghana Premier League players
Ghanaian expatriate sportspeople in Egypt
S.C. Adelaide players
Expatriate footballers in Egypt
Petrojet SC players
Ghana Premier League top scorers